Tiit Terik (born 15 June 1979; Tallinn) is an Estonian politician. A member of the Estonian Centre Party (Estonian: Eesti Keskerakond). He is a Chairman of the Tallinn City Council since 2019 and chairman of the board of The Association of Estonian Cities and Municipalities. Terik is the member of the European Committee of the Regions  and vice-president of the Council of European Municipalities and Regions (CEMR).

He has been member of the Estonian Parliament (2016-2019), City District Governor in Nõmme District Administration (2013-2016) and City District Governor in Pirita District Administration (2007-2013).

Education
Terik studied social work at the Tallinn Pedagogical College. He earned a master's degree in government and administration from Tallinn University in 2015. In 2018 he took the Battalion Staff Officer course at the Estonian Military Academy. He had previously also taken National Defense courses.

Career
Terik is also in the military, where he reached the rank of Second Lieutenant. He earned a Defence League Medal of Merits, III class.

He is a member of the Harju District of the Defence League since 2010. He was then elected multiple times to the Tallinn City Council (2009; 2013; 2017). He was also a member of the Parliamentary Assembly of the Council of Europe (2018-2019).

References

1979 births
Living people
Politicians from Tallinn
Tallinn University alumni
Estonian Centre Party politicians
21st-century Estonian politicians
Members of the Riigikogu, 2015–2019